The Three Gorges Dam is a hydroelectric gravity dam that spans the Yangtze River by the town of Sandouping, in Yiling District, Yichang, Hubei province, central China, downstream of the Three Gorges. The Three Gorges Dam has been the world's largest power station in terms of installed capacity (22,500 MW) since 2012. The dam generates an average 95±20 TWh of electricity per year, depending on annual amount of precipitation in the river basin. After the extensive monsoon rainfalls of 2020, the dam's annual production nearly reached 112 TWh, breaking the previous world record of ~103 TWh set by Itaipu Dam in 2016.

The dam body was completed in 2006. The power plant of the dam project was completed and fully functional as of July 4, 2012, when the last of the main water turbines in the underground plant began production. Each main water turbine has a capacity of 700 MW. Coupling the dam's 32 main turbines with two smaller generators (50 MW each) to power the plant itself, the total electric generating capacity of the dam is 22,500 MW. The last major component of the project, the ship lift, was completed in December 2015.

As well as producing electricity, the dam is intended to increase the Yangtze River's shipping capacity. By providing flood storage space, the dam reduces the potential for floods downstream which have historically plagued the Yangtze Plain. In 1931, floods on the river caused the deaths of up to 4 million people. As a result, China regards the project as a monumental social and economical success, with the design of state-of-the-art large turbines, and a move toward limiting greenhouse gas emissions. The dam has also caused ecological changes including an increased risk of landslides. Because of that, the dam has been controversial both domestically and abroad.

History 

A large dam across the Yangtze River was originally envisioned by Sun Yat-sen in The International Development of China, in 1919. He stated that a dam capable of generating 30 million horsepower (22 GW) was possible downstream of the Three Gorges. In 1932, the Nationalist government, led by Chiang Kai-shek, began preliminary work on plans in the Three Gorges. In 1939, during the Second Sino-Japanese War, Japanese military forces occupied Yichang and surveyed the area. A design, the Otani plan, was completed for the dam in anticipation of a Japanese victory over China.

In 1944, the United States Bureau of Reclamation's head design engineer, John L. Savage, surveyed the area and drew up a dam proposal for the 'Yangtze River Project'. Some 54 Chinese engineers went to the US for training. The original plans called for the dam to employ a unique method for moving ships: the ships would enter locks located at the lower and upper ends of the dam and then cranes would move the ships from one lock to the next. Groups of craft would be lifted together for efficiency. It is not known whether this solution was considered for its water-saving performance or because the engineers thought the difference in height between the river above and below the dam too great for alternative methods. Some exploration, survey, economic study, and design work was done, but the government, in the midst of the Chinese Civil War, halted work in 1947.

After the 1949 Communist Revolution, Mao Zedong supported the project, but began the Gezhouba Dam project nearby first, and economic problems including the Great Leap Forward and the Cultural Revolution slowed progress. After the 1954 Yangtze River Floods, in 1956, Mao Zedong wrote "Swimming", a poem about his fascination with a dam on the Yangtze River. In 1958, after the Hundred Flowers Campaign, some engineers who spoke out against the project were imprisoned.

During the 1980s, the idea of a dam reemerged. The National People's Congress approved the dam in 1992: out of 2,633 delegates, 1,767 voted in favour, 177 voted against, 664 abstained, and 25 members did not vote, giving the legislation an unusually low 67.75% approval rate. Construction started on December 14, 1994. The dam was expected to be fully operational in 2009, but additional projects, such as the underground power plant with six additional generators, delayed full operation until May 2012. The ship lift was completed in 2015.

Composition and dimensions 

Economics 
The government estimated that the Three Gorges Dam project would cost 180 billion yuan (US$22.5 billion). By the end of 2008, spending had reached 148.365 billion yuan, among which 64.613 billion yuan was spent on construction, 68.557 billion yuan on relocating affected residents, and 15.195 billion yuan on financing. It was estimated in 2009 that the construction cost would be recovered when the dam had generated  of electricity, yielding 250 billion yuan. Full cost recovery was thus expected to occur ten years after the dam started full operation, and the full cost of the Three Gorges Dam was recovered by December 20, 2013.

Funding sources include the Three Gorges Dam Construction Fund, profits from the Gezhouba Dam, loans from the China Development Bank, loans from domestic and foreign commercial banks, corporate bonds, and revenue from both before and after the dam was fully operational. Additional charges were assessed as follows: Every province receiving power from the Three Gorges Dam had to pay ¥7.00 per MWh extra. Other provinces had to pay an additional charge of ¥4.00 per MWh. The Tibet Autonomous Region pays no surcharge.

Power generation and distribution

Generating capacity 

Power generation is managed by China Yangtze Power, a listed subsidiary of China Three Gorges Corporation (CTGC)a Central Enterprise administered by SASAC. The Three Gorges Dam is the world's largest capacity hydroelectric power station with 34 generators: 32 main generators, each with a capacity of 700 MW, and two plant power generators, each with capacity of 50 MW, making a total capacity of 22,500 MW. Among those 32 main generators, 14 are installed in the north side of the dam, 12 in the south side, and the remaining six in the underground power plant in the mountain that lies to the south of the dam. Annual electricity generation in 2018 was 101.6 TWh, which is 20 times more than the Hoover Dam.

Generators 
The main generators each weigh approximately 6,000 tonnes and are designed to produce more than 700 MW of power each. The flow rate varies between  depending on the head available; the greater the head, the less water needed to reach full power. Three Gorges uses Francis turbines with a diameter of 9.7/10.4 m (VGS design/Alstom's design) and a rotation speed of 75 revolutions per minute. This means that in order to generate power at 50 Hz, the generator rotors have 80 poles. Rated power is 778 MVA, with a maximum of 840 MVA and a power factor of 0.9. The generator produces electrical power at 20 kV. The electricity generated is then stepped up to 500 kV for transmission at 50 Hz. The generator's stator, the biggest of its kind, is 3.1/3 m in height; the outer diameter of the stator is 21.4/20.9 m, the inner diameter is 18.5/18.8 m, and the bearing load is 5,050/5,500 tonnes. Average efficiency is over 94%, with a maximum efficiency of 96.5% reached.

The generators were manufactured by two joint ventures: one of them Alstom, ABB, Kvaerner, and the Chinese company Harbin Motor; the other Voith, General Electric, Siemens (abbreviated as VGS), and the Chinese company Oriental Motor. The technology transfer agreement was signed together with the contract. Most of the generators are water-cooled. Some of the newer ones are air-cooled, making them simpler in design and easier to manufacture and maintain.

Generator installation progress 
The first north side main generator (No. 2) started on July 10, 2003; the north side became completely operational September 7, 2005, with the implementation of generator No. 9. Full power (9,800 MW) was only reached on October 18, 2006, after the water level reached 156 m.

The 12 south-side main generators are also in operation. No. 22 began operation on June 11, 2007, and No. 15 started up on October 30, 2008. The sixth (No. 17) began operation on December 18, 2007, raising capacity to 14.1 GW, finally surpassing Itaipu dam (14.0 GW), to become the world's largest hydro power plant by capacity.

As of May 23, 2012, when the last main generator, No. 27, finished its final test, the six underground main generators are also in operation, raising capacity to 22.5 GW. After nine years of construction, installation and testing, the power plant was fully operational by July 2012.

Output milestones 

By August 16, 2011, the plant had generated 500 TWh of electricity. In July 2008 it generated 10.3 TWh of electricity, its first month over 10 TWh. On June 30, 2009, after the river flow rate increased to over 24,000 m3/s, all 28 generators were switched on, producing only 16,100 MW because the head available during flood season is insufficient. During an August 2009 flood, the plant first reached its maximum output for a short period.

During the November to May dry season, power output is limited by the river's flow rate, as seen in the diagrams on the right. When there is enough flow, power output is limited by plant generating capacity. The maximum power-output curves were calculated based on the average flow rate at the dam site, assuming the water level is 175 m and the plant gross efficiency is 90.15%. The actual power output in 2008 was obtained based on the monthly electricity sent to the grid.

It has a combined generating capacity of 22.5 gigawatts and a designed annual generation capacity of 88.2 billion kilowatt hours. In 2012, the dam's 32 generating units generated a record 98.1 TWh of electricity, which accounts for 14% of China's total hydro generation. Between 2012 (first year with all 32 generating units operating) and 2021, the dam generated an average of 97.22 TWh of electricity per year, higher than Itaipu dam's average of 89.22 TWh of electricity per year during the same period. Due to extensive monsoon of 2020 year with heavy rainfalls, the annual production reached ~112 TWh that year, which broke the previous world record of annual production by Itaipu Dam equal to ~103 TWh of 2016 year.

Distribution 
The State Grid Corporation and China Southern Power Grid paid a flat rate of ¥250 per MWh (US$35.7) until July 2, 2008. Since then, the price has varied by province, from ¥228.7–401.8 per MWh. Higher-paying customers, such as Shanghai, receive priority. Nine provinces and two cities consume power from the dam.

Power distribution and transmission infrastructure cost about 34.387 billion yuan. Construction was completed in December 2007, one year ahead of schedule.

Power is distributed over multiple 500 kV transmission lines. Three direct current (DC) lines to the East China Grid carry 7,200 MW: Three Gorges – Shanghai (3,000 MW), HVDC Three Gorges – Changzhou (3,000 MW), and HVDC Gezhouba – Shanghai (1,200 MW). The alternating current (AC) lines to the Central China Grid have a total capacity of 12,000 MW. The DC transmission line HVDC Three Gorges – Guangdong to the South China Grid has a capacity of 3,000 MW.

The dam was expected to provide 10% of China's power. However, electricity demand has increased more quickly than previously projected. Even fully operational, on average, it supports only about 1.7% of electricity demand in China in the year of 2011, when the Chinese electricity demand reached 4,692.8 TWh.

Environmental impact

Emissions 
According to the National Development and Reform Commission, 366 grams of coal would produce 1 kWh of electricity during 2006.
From 2003 to 2007, power production equaled that of 84 million tonnes of standard coal.

Erosion and sedimentation 
Two hazards are uniquely identified with the dam. One is that sedimentation projections are not agreed upon, and the other is that the dam sits on a seismic fault. At current levels, 80% of the land in the area is experiencing erosion, depositing about 40 million tons of sediment into the Yangtze annually. Because the flow is slower above the dam, much of this sediment will now settle there instead of flowing downstream, and there will be less sediment downstream.

The absence of silt downstream has three effects:
 Some hydrologists expect downstream riverbanks to become more vulnerable to flooding.
The "arriving siltso long as it does arrivestrengthens the bed on which Shanghai is built... the less the tonnage of arriving sediment the more vulnerable is this biggest of Chinese cities to inundation..."
 Benthic sediment buildup causes biological damage and reduces aquatic biodiversity.

Landslides 
In the first four months of 2010, there were 97 significant landslides.

Waste management 

The dam catalyzed improved upstream wastewater treatment around Chongqing and its suburban areas. According to the Ministry of Environmental Protection, as of April 2007, more than 50 new plants could treat 1.84 million tonnes per day, 65% of the total need. About 32 landfills were added, which could handle 7,664.5 tonnes of solid waste every day. Over one billion tons of wastewater are released annually into the river, which was more likely to be swept away before the reservoir was created. This has left the water looking stagnant, polluted and murky.

Forest cover 
In 1997, the Three Gorges area had 10% forestation, down from 20% in the 1950s.

That is a significant change from the  net loss of forest each year in the 1990s. This is largely due to China's large reforestation effort. This accelerated after the 1998 Yangtze River floods convinced the government that it should restore tree cover, especially in the Yangtze's basin upstream of the Three Gorges Dam.

Wildlife 

Concerns about the potential wildlife impact of the dam predate the National People's Congress's approval in 1992. This region has long been known for its rich biodiversity. It is home to 6,388 species of plants, which belong to 238 families and 1,508 genera. Of these plant species, 57 percent are endangered. These rare species are also used as ingredients in traditional Chinese medicines. Already, the percentage of forested area in the region surrounding the Three Gorges Dam has dropped from twenty percent in 1950 to less than ten percent as of 2002, negatively affecting all plant species in this locality. The region also provides habitats to hundreds of freshwater and terrestrial animal species. Freshwater fish are especially affected by dams due to changes in the water temperature and flow regime. Many other fish are injured in the turbine blades of the hydroelectric plants as well. This is particularly detrimental to the ecosystem of the region because the Yangtze River basin is home to 361 different fish species and accounts for 27 percent of all endangered freshwater fish species in China. Other aquatic species have been endangered by the dam, particularly the baiji, or Chinese river dolphin, now extinct. In fact, Chinese Government scholars even claim that the Three Gorges Dam directly caused the extinction of the baiji. The Chinese paddlefish is also extinct in part due to the dam blocking its migration.

Of the 3,000 to 4,000 remaining critically endangered Siberian crane, a large number currently spend the winter in wetlands that will be destroyed by the Three Gorges Dam. The dam contributed to the functional extinction of the baiji Yangtze river dolphin. Though it was close to this level even at the start of construction, the dam further decreased its habitat and increased ship travel, which are among the factors causing what will be its ultimate demise. In addition, populations of the Yangtze sturgeon are guaranteed to be "negatively affected" by the dam.

Terrestrial impact 
In 2005, NASA scientists calculated that the shift of water mass stored by the dams would increase the total length of the Earth's day by 0.06 microseconds and make the Earth slightly more round in the middle and flat on the poles. A study published in 2022 in the journal Open Geosciences suggests that the change of reservoir water level affects the gravity field in western Sichuan, which in turn affects the seismicity in that area.

Floods, agriculture, industry 

An important function of the dam is to control flooding, which is a major problem for the seasonal river of the Yangtze. Millions of people live downstream of the dam, with many large, important cities like Wuhan, Nanjing, and Shanghai located adjacent to the river. Large areas of farmland and China's most important industrial area are situated beside the river.

This capacity will reduce the frequency of major downstream flooding from once every 10 years to once every 100 years. The dam is expected to minimize the effect of even a "super" flood. The flood waters covered Wuhan, a city of eight million people, for over three months, and the Jingguang Railway was out of service for more than 100 days. The 1954 flood carried  of water. The dam could only divert the water above Chenglingji, leaving  to be diverted. The dam cannot protect against some of the large tributaries downstream, including the Xiang, Zishui, Yuanshui, Lishui, Hanshui, and Gan.

In 1998, a flood in the same area caused billions of dollars worth of damage, when  of farmland were flooded. The flood affected more than 2.3 million people, killing 1,526. In early August 2009, the largest flood in five years passed through the dam site.

The dam discharges its reservoir during the dry season every year, between December and March. This increases the flow rate of the river downstream, providing fresh water for agricultural and industrial usage, and improving shipping conditions. The water also powers the Gezhouba Dam downstream.

Since the filling of the reservoir in 2003, the Three Gorges Dam has supplied an extra  of fresh water to downstream cities and farms over the course of the dry season.

Navigating the dam

Locks 

The installation of ship locks is intended to increase river shipping from ten million to 100 million tonnes annually; as a result transportation costs will be cut between 30 and 37%. Shipping will become safer, since the gorges are notoriously dangerous to navigate.

There are two series of ship locks installed near the dam. Each of them is made up of five stages, with transit time at around four hours. Maximum vessel size is 10,000 tons. The locks are 280 m long, 35 m wide, and 5 m deep (918 × 114 × 16.4 ft). That is  longer than those on the St Lawrence Seaway, but half as deep. Before the dam was constructed, the maximum freight capacity at the Three Gorges site was 18.0 million tonnes per year. From 2004 to 2007, a total of 198 million tonnes of freight passed through the locks. The freight capacity of the river increased six times and the cost of shipping was reduced by 25%. Originaly, the total capacity of the ship locks was expected to reach 100 million tonnes per year. In 2022, their cargo turnover reached 159.65 million tons, with an annual increase of 6% over the past few years.

These locks are staircase locks, whereby inner lock gate pairs serve as both the upper gate and lower gate. The gates are the vulnerable hinged type, which, if damaged, could temporarily render the entire flight unusable. As there are separate sets of locks for upstream and downstream traffic, this system is more water efficient than bi-directional staircase locks.

Ship lift 

In addition to the canal locks, there is a ship lift, a kind of elevator for vessels. The ship lift can lift ships of up to 3,000 tons. The ship lift takes 30 to 40 minutes to transit, as opposed to the three to four hours for stepping through the locks. One complicating factor is that the water level can vary dramatically.

The ship lift's design uses a helical gear system, to climb or descend a toothed rack.

The ship lift was not yet complete when the rest of the project was officially opened on May 20, 2006.
In November 2007, it was reported in the local media that construction of the ship lift started in October 2007.

In February 2012, Xinhua reported that the four towers that are to support the ship lift had almost been completed.

The report said the towers had reached  of the anticipated , the towers would be completed by June 2012 and the entire shiplift in 2015.

As of May 2014, the ship lift was expected to be completed by July 2015. It was tested in December 2015 and announced complete in January 2016. Lahmeyer, the German firm that designed the ship lift, said it will take a vessel less than an hour to transit the lift. An article in Steel Construction says the actual time of the lift will be 21 minutes. It says that the expected dimensions of the  passenger vessels the ship lift's basin was designed to carry will be . The moving mass (including counterweights) is 34,000 tonnes.

The trials of elevator finished in July 2016, the first cargo ship was lifted on July 15; the lift time comprised 8 minutes.
Shanghai Daily reported that the first operational use of the lift was on September 18, 2016, when limited "operational testing" of the lift began.

Portage railways 
Plans also exist for the construction of short portage railways bypassing the dam area altogether. Two short rail lines, one on each side of the river, are to be constructed. The  northern portage railway will run from the Taipingxi port facility on the northern side of the Yangtze, just upstream from the dam, via Yichang East Railway Station to the Baiyang Tianjiahe port facility in Baiyang Town (白洋镇), below Yichang. The  southern portage railway will run from Maoping (upstream of the dam) via Yichang South Railway Station to Zhicheng (on the Jiaozuo–Liuzhou Railway).

In late 2012, preliminary work started along both future railway routes.

Relocation of residents 
Although the huge size of the reservoir necessitated large-scale relocation upstream, it was considered justified by the flood protection provided for the communities downstream of the dam. By June 2008, China had relocated 1.24 million residents (as far as Gaoyang in Hubei Province) as it was estimated that 13 cities, 140 towns and 1,350 villages would be either completely or partially flooded by the reservoir, amounting to roughly 1.5% of Hubei's 60.3 million and Chongqing Municipality's 31.44 million population. Approximately 140,000 residents were relocated to other provinces.

Between 2002 and 2005, Canadian photographer Edward Burtynsky documented the impact of the project on the surrounding areas, including the town of Wan Zhou.  Other photographers who recorded the change include Chengdu-based Muge, Paris-based Zeng Nian (originally from Jiangsu), and Israeli Nadav Kander. Living conditions have deteriorated for many, and hundreds of thousands of people could not find work. The older generation was particularly affected, but the younger generations were able to benefit from the educational and career opportunities afforded by moving to large cities with newly built, modern companies and schools.

Mass relocation was completed on July 22, 2008. Some reports from 2007 claimed that Chongqing Municipality would encourage an additional four million people to move away from the dam to the main urban area of Chongqing by 2020. The municipal government asserted that the relocation was driven by urbanization, rather than a direct result of the dam project, and that the people involved included other areas of the municipality.

Other impacts

Cultural and history 
Cultural and historical relics are being moved to higher ground as they are discovered, but the flooding inevitably covered undiscovered relics. Some sites could not be moved because of their location, size, or design such as the hanging coffins site high in the Shen Nong Gorge is part of the cliffs. The ancient cities of Guizhou, Kuizhou and Wushan were also completely submerged.

National security 
The United States Department of Defense reported that in Taiwan, "proponents of strikes against the mainland apparently hope that merely presenting credible threats to China's urban population or high-value targets, such as the Three Gorges Dam, will deter Chinese military coercion." Destroying the Three Gorges Dam has been a tactic discussed and debated in Taiwan since the early 1990s, when the Dam was still in the planning phase.

The notion that the military in Taiwan would seek to destroy the dam provoked an angry response from the mainland Chinese media. People's Liberation Army General Liu Yuan was quoted in the China Youth Daily saying that the People's Republic of China would be "seriously on guard against threats from Taiwan independence terrorists."

The Three Gorges Dam is a steel-concrete gravity dam. The water is held back by the innate mass of the individual dam sections. As a result, damage to an individual section should not affect other parts of the dam. Zhang Boting, deputy secretary-general of China Society for Hydropower Engineering, suggested that concrete gravity dams are resistant to nuclear strikes. Sung Chao-wen, former Taiwanese Ministry of Defense advisor, called the notion of using cruise missiles to destroy the Three Gorges Dam "ridiculous". He cited missiles would only deliver minimal damage to the reinforced concrete, and any attack attempts would need to go through multiple layers of ground and air defenses.

Structural integrity 
Immediately after the first filling of the reservoir, around 80 hairline cracks were observed in the dam's structure; however, an experts group gave the project overall a good-quality rating and the 163,000 concrete units all passed quality testing, with normal deformation within design limits.

Upstream dams 

In order to maximize the utility of the Three Gorges Dam and cut down on sedimentation from the Jinsha River, the upper course of the Yangtze River, authorities plan to build a series of dams on the Jinsha, including Wudongde Dam, Baihetan Dam, along with the now completed Xiluodu and Xiangjiaba dams. The total capacity of those four dams is 38,500 MW, almost double the capacity of the Three Gorges.
Baihetan is under construction and should be fully operational by July 2022. Wudongde was opened in June 2021. Another eight dams are in the midstream of the Jinsha and eight more upstream of it.

See also 

 Baiheliang Underwater Museum
 South–North Water Transfer Project
 Energy policy of China
 List of largest power stations
 List of largest hydroelectric power stations
 List of power stations in China
 List of dams and reservoirs in China
 Three Gorges Museum
 Liang Weiyan, one of the leading engineers who designed the water turbines for the dam

References

External links 

 China Three Gorges Corporation
 China Yangtze Power Co., Ltd.
 
 

Locks of China
Yangtze River
Gravity dams
2008 establishments in China
Dam controversies
Dams completed in 2008
Dams in China
Dams on the Yangtze River
Energy infrastructure completed in 2012
Hydroelectric power stations in Hubei
Underground power stations
Yichang